Lantoniaina Ramalalanirina is a Malagasy Olympic sprinter. She represented her country in the Women's 4 × 100 metres relay at the 1996 Summer Olympics. Her team did not finish their first qualifying race. Her sister is the fellow Olympian sprinter Nicole Ramalalanirina.

References

1977 births
Living people
Malagasy female sprinters
Olympic athletes of Madagascar
Athletes (track and field) at the 1996 Summer Olympics
Olympic female sprinters